Robert Gerard DeVita (born November 29, 1965) is a former American football linebacker who played one season with the Seattle Seahawks of the National Football League. He first enrolled at Eastern Illinois University before transferring to Benedictine University. He attended Wheaton Central High School in Wheaton, Illinois. DeVita was also member of the Denver Dynamite and Los Angeles Cobras of the Arena Football League.

References

External links
Just Sports Stats

Living people
1965 births
American football linebackers
Benedictine Eagles football players
Denver Dynamite (arena football) players
Eastern Illinois Panthers football
Los Angeles Cobras players
People from Winfield, Illinois
Players of American football from Illinois
Seattle Seahawks players
Sportspeople from DuPage County, Illinois
National Football League replacement players